Lugula Himal (also known as Lagula Himal) is a mountain peak in the Himalayas, located on the border of North western region of Nepal and the Tibet Autonomous Region of China.

Location 

Climbing history 
The official first ascent of Lugula Himal took place on April 23, 2014 by a South Korean expedition (Hong Seung-gi and Feme Sherpa, as well as Bum Won-taek and Lakpa Sherpa).  Before that, on November 2, 2010, there was an unofficial, unauthorized ascent of Lugula Himal by a Frenchman.

References 

Manang District, Nepal
Mountains of the Himalayas
Wikipedia requested photographs by location
Six-thousanders of the Himalayas
Mountains of Nepal